Khosuyeh Rural District is a rural district (dehestan) in the Central District of Zarrin Dasht County, Fars Province, Iran. At the 2006 census, its population was 10,641, in 2,367 families.  The rural district has 9 villages.

References 

Rural Districts of Fars Province
Zarrin Dasht County